Adgaon Budruk is a village in Rahata taluka of Ahmednagar district in the Indian state of Maharashtra.

Population
As per 2011 census, population of village is 2428, of which 1256 are males and 1172 are females.

Transport

Road
Adgaon Budruk is well connected to nearby villages by village roads.

Rail
Shirdi is nearest railway station to village.

Air
Shirdi Airport is the nearest airport to village.

See also
List of villages in Rahata taluka

References 

Villages in Ahmednagar district